Sing and Swing with Buddy Rich is a jazz album recorded in New York City in January 1955 by Buddy Rich.  The first 4 tracks were originally released as a 7-inch, 45 RPM EP.

Track listing
"Everything Happens To Me"
"Wrap Your Troubles In Dreams"
"Sure Thing"
"Glad To Be Unhappy"
 Ballad Medley
"Over The Rainbow"
"You've Changed"
"Time After Time"
"This Is Always"
"My Heart Stood Still"
"I Hadn't Anyone Till You"

Personnel
except "Ballad Medley":
 Buddy Rich – vocals
 Louis Bellson – drums
 Oscar Peterson – piano
 Ray Brown – bass
 Herb Ellis – guitar
 Lee Castle – trumpet
 Howard Gibeling Orchestra - strings
on "Ballad Medley":
 Buddy Rich – drums
 Oscar Peterson – piano
 Ray Brown – bass
 Freddie Green – guitar
 Thad Jones – trumpet
 Joe Newman – trumpet
 Ben Webster – tenor saxophone
 Frank Wess – tenor saxophone

References

Norgran MGN 1031 (LP)
Columbia SEB 10024 (7 inch EP) at discogs.com
Personnel and recording dates at mosaicrecords.com

1955 albums
Buddy Rich albums
Albums produced by Norman Granz
Albums with cover art by David Stone Martin
Norgran Records albums